Note: This compilation includes only those attacks that resulted in casualties. Attacks which did not kill or wound are not included.

Timeline

January
4 January: An Israeli army undercover unit kills a Hamas member in the village of Tal and arrests two others.
9 January: Two Hamas militants wearing Palestinian police uniforms attack an IDF post near the Gaza Strip with grenades and assault rifles. Four Israeli soldiers and one of the attackers are killed.
10 January-11: The Israeli army demolished 59 houses and damaged another 200 in Rafah refugee camp. Over six hundred Palestinians are made homeless. 
14 January: The IDF killed Raed al-Karmi, head of Al-Aqsa Martyrs' Brigades (AMB) in Tulkarm. AMB gunmen kill an Israeli soldier near Shavei Shomron.

17 January: 2002 Bat Mitzvah massacre: A gunman killed six and wounded 33 in a Bat Mitzvah celebration in Hadera. The Al-Aqsa Martyrs' Brigades claimed responsibility for the attack.  Wanted AMB member Khamis Abdallah is killed by the Israeli army in an apparent assassination in Nablus. A Palestinian is killed by shellfire on the Gaza border. Two Preventive Security Force officers are killed when an Israeli F-16 destroyed the Palestinian Authority's main police headquarters in Tulkarem.
18 January: In an apparent assassination, wanted AMB member Faraj Hani Odeh Nazzal is killed in the West Bank.
21 January: A 19-year-old Palestinian was killed and seven wounded in fighting with Israeli forces in the West Bank city of Tulkarm.

February
16 February: Two teenagers killed in a suicide bombing at a pizzeria in the northern West Bank. Another teenage girl, wounded in the attack, died 11 days later. The PFLP claimed responsibility.
18 February: An Israeli-Arab policeman is killed by a suicide bomber. Fatah (Al-Aqsa) claims responsibility. An Israeli settler woman is and two soldiers trying to assist her are killed in a combined shooting and bombing in the Gaza Strip. The gunman who killed the woman is run over and killed by an Israeli civilian who was driving nearby, who sustained gunshot wounds. Fatah (Al-Aqsa) claims responsibility.
19 February: Palestinian guerillas attacked an army checkpoint at Ein 'Ariq near Ramallah killing six Israeli soldiers. The Al-Aqsa Brigade and Hamas claimed joint responsibility. 
20 February: In retaliation of the raid 19 February, Israeli warplanes and helicopter gunships attack structures belonging to the Palestinian Authority. Israeli artillery also attacks Palestinian police checkpoints, and Israeli troops engage in firefights with Palestinians. A total of 16 Palestinians are killed. 
26 February: A 15-year-old Palestinian girl, wielding a knife, was shot dead at an Israeli checkpoint near Tulkarm in what appeared to have been a failed attack at that checkpoint. 
27 February: An Israeli is shot and killed by one of his Palestinian employees in a factory in the Atarot industrial area, north of Jerusalem.
28 February: Two Palestinians were killed and more than 100 wounded as Israel forces stormed the Balata refugee camp. In Jenin, six Palestinian policemen were shot dead as tanks entered the camp.

March
2 March: A suicide bombing near a yeshiva in a religious Jerusalem neighborhood killed 11 people and injured more than 50. The bullet-ridden body of a Jerusalem police detective was discovered next to his trail motorcycle, near the Mar Saba Monastery in the Judean Desert.
3 March: A Palestinian sniper kills seven Israeli soldiers and three civilians at an IDF roadblock near the settlement of Ofra.
4 March: Six Palestinians, five of them children, were killed in Ramallah when a tank shelled a pickup truck and another vehicle belonging to a suspected Hamas militant. In Jenin, six more Palestinians were killed in a clash with Israeli soldiers. In Rafah refugee camp, two Palestinian gunmen and one civilian was killed and three buildings demolished. 
5 March: Three people were killed in Tel Aviv when a Palestinian gunman opened fire on two adjacent restaurants. An Israeli woman was killed in shooting attack on the Bethlehem bypass "tunnel" road, south of Jerusalem, on her way to work. Her husband was injured. An 85-year-old Israeli was killed in a suicide bombing on Egged bus No. 823 as it entered the Afula central bus station.
7 March: Five Israeli teenagers were killed and 23 injured when a Hamas gunmen infiltrated the Gush Katif settlement of Atzmona, opening fire and throwing hand grenades at the school and nearby houses. One of those killed sustained third degree burns over 90% of his body after a grenade was thrown through the window of his dorm room. He died of his wounds in the hospital five hours after the attack.
9 March: A 9-month-old baby and a man were killed when two Palestinians opened fire and threw grenades at cars and pedestrians in Netanya, close to the city's boardwalk and hotels. A Palestinian suicide bombing at Cafe Moment in central Jerusalem killed 11 people killed and injured 54 others.
12 March: One Israeli was killed and another wounded in a shooting attack at the Kiryat Sefer checkpoint, east of Modi'in Illit. Six people (three men and three women, including a teenager) killed when two gunmen opened fire from an ambush on Israeli vehicles traveling between Shlomi and Kibbutz Metzuba near the northern border with Lebanon.
14 March: An Israeli tank is destroyed by a mine near Netzarim, killing three soldiers and wounding two. DFLP and Fatah claimed responsibility.
17 March: An 18-year-old girl was killed and 16 people were injured when a gunman opened fire on passersby in the center of Kfar Saba.
20 March: Seven Israelis killed in a suicide bombing of an Egged bus No. 823 traveling from Tel Aviv to Nazareth, near Afula.
21 March: Three people killed and 86 injured when a suicide bomber detonated a bomb, packed with metal spikes and nails, in the center of a crowd of shoppers on King George Street in central Jerusalem.
27 March: The Passover Massacre: 30 Israelis were killed and over 140 wounded when a suicide bomber exploded in the crowded dining room of the Park Hotel in Netanya.

April

1 April: A 19-year-old police volunteer was killed in Jerusalem, when a Palestinian suicide bomber driving toward the city center blew himself up after being stopped at a roadblock. The Fatah al-Aqsa Martyrs Brigades claimed responsibility for the attack.
10 April: Eight people killed and 22 wounded in a suicide bombing on Egged bus #960, en route from Haifa to Jerusalem, which exploded near Kibbutz Yagur, east of Haifa.
12 April: Seven people killed by a woman suicide bomber who detonated a powerful charge at a bus stop on Jaffa road next to the entrance to Jerusalem's Mahane Yehuda open-air market.  Another 104 people were injured in the blast, among them nine Arabs.  The Al-Aqsa Martyrs' Brigades claimed responsibility for the attack.
17 April: Tel Aviv resident Meir Franco, 48, was murdered by gunman in Sinai.
27 April: Four people, including a 5-year-old girl, killed when Palestinian gunmen dressed in IDF uniforms and combat gear cut through the settlement's defensive perimeter fence and entered Adora, west of Hebron. The gunmen entered several homes, firing on people in their bedrooms.
29 April: Israeli forces invaded the West Bank town of Hebron and killed nine Palestinians. In the Church of the Nativity in Bethlehem, a Palestinian gunmen was shot dead by Israeli snipers. 
From 3 April to 12 April: 52 Palestinians, 5-22 of them civilians (sources vary) and 23 Israeli soldiers were confirmed killed in Jenin.

May

7 May: 15 people killed and 55 wounded when a suicide bomber detonated a powerful charge in a game club located on the 3rd floor of a building in Rishon LeZion, causing part of the building to collapse. Hamas claimed responsibility for the attack.
12 May: An Israeli settler of Pe'at Sadeh in the southern Gaza Strip was shot and killed by a Palestinian laborer, when he came to pick him up at a checkpoint.
19 May: Three Israelis killed when a suicide bomber blew himself up in a crowded section of Netanya's open-air market.
21 May: One Israeli injured when a bomb explodes Kehilat Katzuvitch Street in northern Tel Aviv.
22 May: Two people (one of them a teenager) are killed in suicide bombing in the heart of Rishon LeZion.
27 May: A woman and her infant granddaughter, aged 14 months, of Petah Tikva were killed when a suicide bomber detonated himself near an ice cream parlor outside a shopping mall.
28 May: Two Israelis were killed when shots were fired at the car in which they were traveling south on the Ramallah bypass road. Three yeshiva high school students killed in Itamar, southeast of Nablus, when a Palestinian gunman infiltrated the community and opened fire on the teenagers.
29 May: Two Palestinians were killed by Israeli troops. On in the southern Gaza Strip in Khan Yunis and one gunman belonging to Islamic Jihad in Jenin on the West Bank. Additionally, four homes were blown up and 20 damaged in Rafah. Israeli troops kill two Palestinians</ref>

June

5 June: 17 people killed when a car packed with a large quantity of explosives struck Egged bus No. 830 traveling from Tel-Aviv to Tiberias at the Megiddo junction near Afula. The car exploded near the gasoline tank of the bus, causing it to burst into flames. Most of the casualties were soldiers who were on their way to their bases. The Islamic Jihad claimed responsibility for the attack.
6 June: 18-year-old Israeli student died of gunshot wounds to the chest sustained in a shooting attack near Ofra, north of Ramallah, when Palestinian gunmen opened fire in an ambush.
8 June: Three Israelis, including a ninth month pregnant woman, were shot dead when gunmen infiltrated the community of Carmei Tzur north of Hebron.
8 June: A terrorist infiltrated into the Jordan Valley community of Mechora. A woman was murdered and her husband, 30, wounded.
11 June: A 14-year-old girl was killed when a Palestinian suicide bomber set off a relatively small pipe bomb at a shwarma restaurant in Herzliya.
18 June: 19 people killed and 74 wounded in a suicide bombing at the Patt junction in Egged bus no. 32A traveling from Gilo to the center of Jerusalem. The bomber boarded the bus at the stop in Beit Safafa, an Arab neighborhood opposite Gilo, and almost immediately detonated the large bomb which he carried in a bag stuffed with ball bearings. The blast destroyed the front half of the bus, packed with people on their way to work and schoolchildren.
19 June: Seven people, including a 5-year-old girl and her grandmother, were killed when a suicide bomber blew himself up at a crowded bus stop and hitchhiking post at the French Hill intersection in northern Jerusalem.
20 June: Five people, including a mother and three of her sons, were murdered when a gunman entered their home in Itamar, south of Nablus, and opened fire.

July

16 July:  Nine people (two men, six women, and an infant child) were killed in an attack on Dan bus no. 189 traveling from Bnei Brak to Emmanuel in the northern West Bank. Two 20-kilo bombs were set off about 200 meters from the town's entrance, damaging the bus's front tires and forcing it off the road. The explosion damaged the bus doors, trapping the passengers inside. The militants then started to shoot at the bus, firing through the unprotected roof and throwing grenades through the narrow upper windows, which are not armored.
17 July: Five people were killed and about 40 injured in a double suicide bombing on Neve Sha'anan Street near the old central bus station in Tel Aviv. The bombs, which were strapped to the waists of the bombers, contained nails and metal shards.
31 July: Nine people, some of them American students, were killed when a bomb exploded in the Frank Sinatra cafeteria on the Hebrew University Mt. Scopus campus in Jerusalem.

August

1 August: A 27-year-old Israeli man was found shot in the head at point-blank range and bound, west of Tulkarem, near the Green Line.
4 August: Nine people were killed in the suicide bombing of Egged bus No. 361 traveling from Haifa to Safed at the Meron junction in northern Israel. The blast blew off the roof of the bus, which then burst into flames, killing or wounding nearly everyone inside. A 34-year-old Israeli and a 52-year-old Palestinian were killed when a Palestinian gunman opened fire with a pistol near the Damascus Gate of Jerusalem's Old City.
5 August: A young Israeli couple were killed when gunmen opened fire on their car as they were traveling on the Ramallah-Nablus road near Eli in the northern West Bank. One of their children was wounded in the attack.
10 August: A 31-year-old woman was killed and her husband seriously wounded when a Palestinian gunman infiltrated Moshav Mechora in the Jordan Valley, and opened fire outside their home.

September

5 September: A Merkava heavy tank was destroyed by a mine near the Kissufim Crossing, killing 1 soldiers and wounding 3. Popular Resistance Committees claimed responsibility.
18 September: The charred body of a 67-year-old Israeli construction contractor was found near al-Azzariya, a Palestinian village near the settlement of Ma'ale Adummim, east of Jerusalem. A 36-year-old Israeli was killed when gunmen opened fire on his car near Mevo Dotan, north of Jenin in the West Bank. An Israeli policeman was killed and three people were wounded in a suicide bombing at a bus stop at the Umm al Fahm junction.
19 September: Six people were killed when a suicide bomber detonated a bomb in Dan bus No. 4 on Allenby Street, opposite the Great Synagogue in Tel-Aviv. Hamas claimed responsibility for the attack.
23 September: A 48-year-old man was killed and three of his children wounded, one seriously, in a shooting attack near the Cave of the Patriarchs in Hebron during the Sukkot festival.

October
8 October: A 51-year-old Israeli was critically wounded in an ambush shooting south of Hebron. He died of his wounds the following day. Hamas claimed responsibility for the attack.
9 October: Palestinian gunmen shot and wounded four Israelis traveling in a car near Hebron.
10 October: A 71-year-old woman was killed and about 30 people were wounded when a suicide bomber blew himself up while trying to board Dan bus No. 87 across from Bar-Ilan University on the Geha highway (Route 4) in central Israel.
21 October: 14 persons were killed when a bus was blown up in a suicide attack by a bomber driving an explosives-laden jeep near the Karkur junction.
27 October: Three IDF soldiers killed in a suicide bombing at the Sonol gas station at the entrance to Ariel in the northern West Bank  while trying to prevent the bomber from detonating the bomb. About 20 people were wounded in the bombing.
29 October: A woman and two 14-year-old girls were shot dead by a Palestinian gunman who infiltrated the settlement of Hermesh, north of Tulkarm, in the northern West Bank. A soldier and a resident were wounded in the assault.

November

4 November: Two persons killed when a Palestinian suicide bomber detonated himself at a Kfar Saba shopping mall.
6 November: Two Israeli farmers were shot to dead by a Palestinian gunman posing as a worker near Pe'at Sadeh in the southern Gaza Strip.
10 November: Five people, including a mother and her 4- and 5-year-old children, were shot and killed by a gunman who infiltrated Kibbutz Metzer, located east of Hadera near the Green Line. The gunman shot the mother and children as they hugged one another.
15 November: 12 people killed, nine soldiers and three paramilitary security guards from the Kiryat Arba emergency response team, and 15 wounded in Hebron when Palestinian militants drew security forces into an ambush.
21 November: 11 people killed and about 50 wounded in a suicide bombing on a No. 20 Egged bus in the Kiryat Menahem neighborhood of Jerusalem. Most of the victims were high-school students on their way to school.
Iain Hook shot and killed by an Israeli sniper.  He was a British worker for UNRWA in Jenin.
28 November: 2002 Beit She'an attack : Six Israelis and two terrorists.
28 November: Kenyan hotel bombing: Three Israelis, including two brothers, and 10 Kenyans killed when a car bomb exploded in the lobby of the Israeli-owned beachfront Paradise Hotel, frequented almost exclusively by Israeli tourists near Mombasa in Kenya. 21 Israelis and 60 Kenyans were wounded in the attack. Six Israelis were killed when two gunmen opened fire and threw grenades at the Likud polling station in Bet She'an, where party members were casting their votes in the Likud primary.

December
20 December: A 40-year-old rabbi was shot and killed on the Kissufim corridor road (in the Gaza Strip) while driving with his wife and six children to attend a pre-wedding Sabbath celebration in Afula. The Islamic Jihad claimed responsibility for the attack.
26 December: In Nablus, Israeli troops killed two Palestinians. A Palestinian who had opened fire against a patrol, and a 15-year-old Palestinian boy who was killed in the crossfire. In Tulkarem, one man was killed when he tried to escape arrest. According to Palestinian and Israeli sources he was a member of the Al Aqsa Martyrs Brigade. In Ramallah three Palestinians, one of them a Hamas member, were killed by Israeli troops in separate incidents. In the West Bank village of Qabatiya, Hamza Abu Roub, a top Islamic Jihad leader, was killed while resisting arrest. Four IDF soldiers were wounded in the incident. Thereafter Abu Roub's house was blown up. In the Gaza Strip Israeli troops killed two Hamas members which were attempting an attack on the Netzarim settlement.
27 December: Two IDF soldiers and two yeshiva students were killed in an attack on the Hesder yeshiva (military religious academy) of Otniel.

See also
Israel-Gaza conflict

References

2002 in Israel
2002 in the Palestinian territories
Israeli-Palestinian conflict
2002
2002
2002
Terrorist incidents in Israel in 2002
2002